In the design of electrical power systems, the ANSI standard device numbers  (ANSI /IEEE Standard C37.2 Standard for Electrical Power System Device Function Numbers, Acronyms, and Contact Designations ) identifies the features of a protective device such as a relay or circuit breaker. These types of devices protect electrical systems and components from damage when an unwanted event occurs, such as an electrical fault. Device numbers are used to identify the functions of devices shown on a schematic diagram. Function descriptions are given in the standard. 

One physical device may correspond to one function number, for example "29 Isolating Contactor", or a single physical device may have many function numbers associated with it, such as a numerical protective relay. Suffix and prefix letters may be added to further specify the purpose and function of a device. 

ANSI/IEEE C37.2-2008 is one of a continuing series of revisions of the standard, which originated in 1928 as American Institute of Electrical Engineers Standard No. 26.

List of device numbers and acronyms 

1 - Master Element
2 - Time-delay Starting or Closing Relay
3 - Checking or Interlocking Relay, complete Sequence
4 - Master Protective
5 - Stopping Device, Emergency Stop Switch
6 - Starting Circuit Breaker
7 - Rate of Change Relay
7F - Rate Of Change Of Frequency Relay (ROCOF)
8 - Control Power Disconnecting Device
9 - Reversing Device
10 - Unit Sequence Switch
11 - Multifunction Device
12 - Overspeed Device
13 - Synchronous-Speed Device
14 - Underspeed Device
15 - Speed or Frequency Matching Device
16 - Data Communications Device
17 - Shunting or Discharge Switch
18 - Accelerating or Decelerating Device
19 - Starting-to-Running Transition Contactor
20 - Electrically-Operated Valve ( Solenoid Valve )
21 - Distance Relay
21G - Ground Distance
21P - Phase Distance
22 – Equalizer circuit breaker
23 – Temperature control device, Heater
24 – Volts per hertz relay
25 – Synchronizing or synchronism-check device
26 – Apparatus thermal device, Temperature Switch
27 – Undervoltage relay
27P - Phase Undervoltage 
27S - DC undervoltage relay
27TN - Third Harmonic Neutral Undervoltage
27TN/59N - 100% Stator Earth Fault
27X - Auxiliary Undervoltage
27 AUX - Undervoltage Auxiliary Input
27/27X - Bus/Line Undervoltage
27/50 - Inadvertent Energization
28 - Flame Detector
29 - Isolating Contactor
30 - Annunciator Relay
31 - Separate Excitation Device
32 - Directional Power Relay
32L - Low Forward Power
32H - High Directional Power
32N - Wattmetric Zero-Sequence Directional
32P - Directional Power
32R - Reverse Power
33 - Position Switch
34 - Master Sequence Device
35 - Brush-Operating or Slip-ring Short Circuiting Device
36 - Polarity or Polarizing Voltage Device
37 - Undercurrent or Underpower Relay
37P - Underpower
38 - Bearing Protective Device / Bearing Rtd
39 - Mechanical Condition Monitor ( Vibration )
40 - Field Relay / Loss of Excitation
41 - Field Circuit Breaker
42 - Running Circuit Breaker
43 - Manual Transfer or Selector Device
44 - Unit Sequence Starting Relay
45 - Atmospheric Condition Monitor (fumes, smoke, fire) 
46 - Reverse-Phase or Phase Balance Current Relay or Stator Current Unbalance
47 - Phase-Sequence or Phase Balance Voltage Relay
48 - Incomplete Sequence Relay / Blocked Rotor
49 - Machine or Transformer Thermal Relay / Thermal Overload
49RTD - RTD Biased Thermal Overload
50 - Instantaneous Overcurrent Relay
50BF - Breaker Failure or LBB ( Local Breaker Back-up )
50DD - Current Disturbance Detector
50EF - End Fault Protection
50G - Ground Instantaneous Overcurrent
50IG - Isolated Ground Instantaneous Overcurrent
50LR - Acceleration Time
50N - Neutral Instantaneous Overcurrent
50NBF - Neutral Instantaneous Breaker Failure
50P - Phase Instantaneous Overcurrent
50SG - Sensitive Ground Instantaneous Overcurrent
50SP - Split Phase Instantaneous Current
50Q - Negative Sequence Instantaneous Overcurrent
50/27 - Inadvertent Energization
50/51 - Instantaneous / Time-delay Overcurrent relay
50/74 - Ct Trouble
50/87 - Instantaneous Differential
51 - AC Time Overcurrent Relay
51C - Voltage Controlled Time Overcurrent
51G - Ground Time Overcurrent
51LR - AC inverse time overcurrent (locked rotor) protection relay
51N - Neutral Time Overcurrent
51P - Phase Time Overcurrent
51R - Locked / Stalled Rotor
51V - Voltage Restrained Time Overcurrent
51Q - Negative Sequence Time Overcurrent
52 – AC circuit breaker
52a - AC circuit breaker position (contact open when circuit breaker open)
52b - AC circuit breaker position (contact closed when circuit breaker open)
53 - Exciter or Dc Generator Relay
54 - Turning Gear Engaging Device
55 - Power Factor Relay
56 - Field Application Relay
57 - Short-Circuiting or Grounding Device
58 - Rectification Failure Relay
59 - Overvoltage Relay
59B - Bank Phase Overvoltage
59N - Neutral Overvoltage
59NU - Neutral Voltage Unbalance
59P - Phase Overvoltage
59X - Auxiliary Overvoltage
59Q - Negative Sequence Overvoltage
60 - Voltage or Current Balance Relay
60N - Neutral Current Unbalance
60P - Phase Current Unbalance
61 - Density Switch or Sensor
62 - Time-Delay Stopping or Opening Relay
63 - Pressure Switch Detector
64 - Ground Protective Relay
64F - Field Ground Protection
64R – Rotor earth fault
64REF – Restricted earth fault differential
64S – Stator earth fault
64S - Sub-harmonic Stator Ground Protection
64TN - 100% Stator Ground
65 - Governor
66 - Notching or Jogging Device/Maximum Starting Rate/Starts Per Hour/Time Between Starts
67 - AC Directional Overcurrent Relay
67G - Ground Directional Overcurrent
67N - Neutral Directional Overcurrent
67Ns – Earth fault directional
67P - Phase Directional Overcurrent
67SG - Sensitive Ground Directional Overcurrent
67Q - Negative Sequence Directional Overcurrent
68 - Blocking Relay / Power Swing Blocking
69 - Permissive Control Device
70 - Rheostat
71 - Liquid Switch, Level Switch
72 - DC Circuit Breaker
73 - Load-Resistor Contactor
74 - Alarm Relay
75 - Position Changing Mechanism
76 - DC Overcurrent Relay
77 - Telemetering Device, Speed Sensor
78 - Phase Angle Measuring or Out-of-Step Protective Relay
78V - Loss of Mains
79 - AC Reclosing Relay / Auto Reclose
80 - Liquid or Gas Flow Relay
81 - Frequency Relay
81O - Over Frequency
81R - an invalid use of R suffix - refer 7F for Rate Of Change Of Frequency (ROCOF)
81U - Under Frequency
82 - DC Reclosing Relay
83 - Automatic Selective Control or Transfer Relay
84 - Operating Mechanism
85 - Pilot Communications, Carrier or Pilot-Wire Relay
86 - Lock-Out Relay, Master Trip Relay
87 - Differential Protective Relay
87B - Bus Differential
87G - Generator Differential
87GT - Generator/Transformer Differential
87L - Segregated Line Current Differential
87LG - Ground Line Current Differential
87M - Motor Differential
87O - Overall Differential
87PC - Phase Comparison
87RGF - Restricted Ground Fault
87S - Stator Differential
87S - Percent Differential
87T - Transformer Differential
87V - Voltage Differential
88 - Auxiliary Motor or Motor Generator
89 - Line Switch
90 - Regulating Device
91 - Voltage Directional Relay
92 - Voltage And Power Directional Relay
93 - Field-Changing Contactor
94 - Tripping or Trip-Free Relay
95 – TRIP CIRCUIT HEALTHY
96 – Transmitter
97 – For specific applications where other numbers are not suitable
98 – For specific applications where other numbers are not suitable
99 – For specific applications where other numbers are not suitable
Acronyms Description
AFD - Arc Flash Detector
CLK - Clock or Timing Source
CLP - Cold Load Pickup
DDR – Dynamic Disturbance Recorder
DFR – Digital Fault Recorder
DME – Disturbance Monitor Equipment
ENV – Environmental data
HIZ – High Impedance Fault Detector
HMI – Human Machine Interface
HST – Historian
LGC – Scheme Logic
MET – Substation Metering
PDC – Phasor Data Concentrator
PMU – Phasor Measurement Unit
PQM – Power Quality Monitor
RIO – Remote Input/Output Device
RTD - Resistance Temperature Detector
RTU – Remote Terminal Unit/Data Concentrator
SER – Sequence of Events Recorder
TCM – Trip Circuit Monitor
LRSS – Local/Remote selector switch
VTFF - Vt Fuse Fail
Suffixes Description
_1 - Positive-Sequence
_2 - Negative-Sequence
A - Alarm, Auxiliary Power
AC - Alternating Current
AN - Anode
B - Bus, Battery, or Blower
BF - Breaker Failure
BK - Brake
BL - Block (Valve)
BP - Bypass
BT - Bus Tie
BU - Backup
C - Capacitor, Condenser, Compensator, Carrier Current, Case or Compressor
CA - Cathode
CH - Check (Valve)
D - Discharge (Valve)
DC - Direct Current
DCB - Directional Comparison Blocking
DCUB - Directional Comparison Unblocking
DD - Disturbance Detector
DUTT - Direct Underreaching Transfer Trip
E - Exciter
F - Feeder, Field, Filament, Filter, or Fan
G - Ground or Generator
GC - Ground Check
H - Heater or Housing
L - Line or Logic
M - Motor or Metering
MOC - Mechanism Operated Contact
N - Neutral or Network
O - Over
P - Phase or Pump
PC - Phase Comparison
POTT - Pott: Permissive Overreaching Transfer Trip
PUTT - Putt: Permissive Underreaching Transfer Trip
R - Reactor, Rectifier, or Room
S - Synchronizing, Secondary, Strainer, Sump, or Suction (Valve)
SOTF - Switch On To Fault
T - Transformer or Thyratron
TD - Time Delay
TDC - Time-Delay Closing Contact
TDDO - Time Delayed Relay Coil Drop-Out
TDO - Time-Delay Opening Contact
TDPU - Time Delayed Relay Coil Pickup
THD - Total Harmonic Distortion
TH - Transformer (High-Voltage Side)
TL - Transformer (Low-Voltage Side)
TM - Telemeter
TT - Transformer (Tertiary-Voltage Side)
Q  - Lube Oil
W  - Water
F  - Fuel
G  - Gas
U - Under or Unit
X - Auxiliary
Z - Impedance

Suffixes and prefixes 
A suffix letter or number  may be used with the device number; for example, suffix N is used if the device is connected to a Neutral wire (example: 59N in a relay is used for protection against Neutral Displacement); and suffixes X,Y,Z are used for auxiliary devices. Similarly, the "G" suffix can denote a "ground", hence a "51G" is a time overcurrent ground relay. The "G" suffix can also mean "generator", hence an "87G" is a Generator Differential Protective Relay while an "87T" is a Transformer Differential Protective Relay. "F" can denote "field" on a generator or "fuse", as in the protective fuse for a pickup transformer. Suffix numbers are used to distinguish multiple "same" devices in the same equipment such as 51–1, 51–2.

Device numbers may be combined if the device provides multiple functions, such as the Instantaneous / Time-delay Overcurrent relay denoted as 50/51.

For device 16, the suffix letters further define the device: the first suffix letter is 'S' for serial or 'E' for Ethernet. The subsequent letters are: 'C' security processing function (e.g. VPN, encryption), 'F' firewall or message filter, 'M' network managed function, 'R' rotor, 'S' switch and 'T' telephone component. Thus a managed Ethernet switch would be 16ESM.

References 

 IEEE Standard for Electrical Power System Device Function Numbers, Acronyms, and Contact Designations', IEEE Std C37.2-2008

American National Standards Institute standards
Electrical components